John Rhys Coiro (born March 12, 1979)  is an American film, television, and stage actor. He began acting on Broadway but is best known for on-screen roles such as Billy Walsh on the television series Entourage.

Early life
Born in Santo Stefano in Aspromonte Calabria, Italy, to David Coiro and Ann Baynes Coiro, Coiro grew up in Princeton, New Jersey and attended Princeton High School. As a teenager, Coiro began working for a local artist who introduced him to the artistic director of The Passage Theater, June Ballinger.  Ballinger got him involved with the State Street theater project in Trenton NJ, modeled after Primary stages' 52nd street project.  From there, Coiro spent summers building sets and operating lights at the New Jersey Shakespeare festival. Inspired by numerous productions, including Julie Taymor's "Titus Andronicus" at TFANA, Coiro decided to study theater at Carnegie Mellon University, where he eventually graduated with a BFA.  He also spent time studying at The Moscow Art Theater in Russia.

Career
At age 19, Coiro got his first professional gig as an understudy to three roles in the American premiere of Conor McPherson's off-Broadway play This Lime Tree Bower directed by Harris Yulin at Primary Stages.  Within a month of graduating from CMU, Coiro landed the role of Eddie the Bellhop in the Lincoln Center revival of George S. Kaufman's Dinner at Eight, directed by Gerald Guitierrez.

Coiro then moved to Los Angeles and began working in construction, including a stint building a house with Nick Offerman.  In fact, Coiro received the call that he'd landed his first on-screen acting gig, as Billy Walsh on Entourage, while digging a hole for a deck in Echo Park.  The role of Walsh was originally meant to be a guest star but soon evolved into an iconic character that has defined Coiro's career.

Coiro shared a studio space in Historic Filipino town with then-unknown painter Jonas Wood. During this period, Coiro formed an underground, traditional Irish music band with artists Matt Johnson and Greg Santos, that played around East LA. In 2007, following the birth of his first child, Coiro accepted the role of Sean Hillinger on the 7th season of 24.  Coiro was cast in The Last House On The Left but had to pull out when the writer's strike abruptly ended and production resumed on 24. The role ended up being given to Aaron Paul. In 2009 Coiro returned to the stage, starring in a production of Howard Korder's "Boy's Life" at Second Stage in New York opposite Jason Biggs.  In 2010 Coiro starred in Slamdance Winner Snow and Ashes and in 2011 appeared alongside Alexander Skarsard in Screen Gems' remake of Straw Dogs.  In 2014, Coiro was antagonist to Stevie Van Zandt's character on the final season of Netflix's first original series, the Norwegian mega-hit Lillyhammer and he played one of the original Texas Rangers in The History Channel's Mini-series Texas Rising, alongside Ray Liotta, Bill Paxton and Brendan Fraser.  During this show he honed his riding and roping skills.  In 2015 Coiro played Armenian gangster Ari Adamian on the final season of USA's Graceland. In 2017 and 2018 Coiro appeared as a series regular in Unsolved and in arcs on Ray Donovan,  The Walking Dead, and S.W.A.T.

Personal life 
Coiro is fluent in Italian and Spanish.

In 2016, Coiro traveled to Standing Rock, North Dakota to take part in the peaceful protest against the North Dakota Access Pipeline.

Coiro is married to director Kat Coiro, with whom he worked on Life Happens and She-Hulk: Attorney at Law.  They live in Los Angeles with their three children.

Filmography

Film

Television

References

1979 births
Living people
American male film actors
American male stage actors
American male television actors
Carnegie Mellon University College of Fine Arts alumni
Male actors from New Jersey
Italian emigrants to the United States
People of Calabrian descent
People from Princeton, New Jersey
Princeton High School (New Jersey) alumni